7090 may refer to:

 IBM 7090 mainframe computer
 IBM 7090/94 IBSYS operating system
 NGC 7090 spiral galaxy
 A year in the 70th century